Quintus Fufius Calenus (died 40 BC) was a Roman general, and consul in 47 BC.

As tribune of the plebeians in 61 BC, he was chiefly instrumental in securing the acquittal of the notorious Publius Clodius when charged with having profaned the mysteries of Bona Dea (Cicero, Ad. Att. 1.16). In 59 BC Calenus was praetor, and brought forward a law that the senators, knights, and tribuni aerarii, who composed the judices, should vote separately, so that it might be known how they gave their votes (Cassius Dio xxxviii. 8). He fought in Gaul (51 BC) and Spain (49 BC) under Julius Caesar, who, after he had crossed over to Greece (48 BC), sent Calenus from Epirus to bring over the rest of the troops from Italy. On the passage to Italy, most of the ships were captured by Bibulus and Calenus himself escaped with difficulty. In 47 BC, he was raised to the consulship through the influence of Caesar. After the death of the dictator, he joined Mark Antony, for whom he commanded eleven legions in the north of Italy. Calenus died in 40 BC, while stationed with his army at the foot of the Alps, just as he was on the point of marching against Octavian; but Calenus' son handed over the legions to the future emperor.

References 

 Caesar, B.G. viii. 39; B.C. i. 87, iii. 26
 Cicero Philippicae, viii. 4.
 Oxford Classical Dictionary

Ancient Roman generals
1st-century BC Roman consuls
Calenus, Quintus
Year of birth unknown
40 BC deaths